Packhouse Ford, also known historically as Pack Horse Ford,  Blackford's Ford and Boteler's Ford, is a historic crossing point of the Potomac River. The crossing was a Native American crossing site and eventually became a major crossing point in colonial times. During the American Civil War, it was used by military forces involved in the 1862 Battle of Antietam. The site of the ford is marked by a commemorative marker on the West Virginia side of the river, at the junction of River and Trough Roads.

The ford was listed on the National Register of Historic Places in 2015.

See also
Battle of Harpers Ferry
National Register of Historic Places listings in Washington County, Maryland

References

Archaeological sites on the National Register of Historic Places in Maryland
Transportation in Washington County, Maryland
Potomac River
National Register of Historic Places in Washington County, Maryland